Starkville can refer to:

Starkville, Colorado
Starkville, Georgia
Starkville, Mississippi
Starkville, New York
Starkville, Pennsylvania